= Manguariba =

Unofficial region of Rio de Janeiro

Coordinates: 22°52′24″S 43°37′45″W

Manguariba is a region of Rio de Janeiro, but not officially recognized as a neighborhood.
